Fort Revere Park is a state-owned historic site and public recreation area situated on a small peninsula in the town of Hull, Massachusetts. The park occupies  on Telegraph Hill in Hull Village and houses the remains of two seacoast fortifications, including former Fort Revere.

Activities and amenities
The park includes a water tower with observation deck, a military history museum, and picnicking facilities and is open from sunrise until sunset. The tower closed in 2012, but may soon have a revival due to a 2.2 million dollar fund provided by a town meeting in 2022 which hopes to reopen the tower.

Graffiti 
The park has been the site of much graffiti. Tagging peaked in 2016 and 2017, and has decreased since then. In 2016, many local volunteers in Hull associated with the Fort Revere Park and Preservation Society and other Hull residents painted over much of the vandalism with white, spray-resistant paint.

References

External links

Fort Revere Park Department of Conservation and Recreation
Fort Revere Park and Preservation Society

Buildings and structures in Plymouth County, Massachusetts
Hull, Massachusetts
Parks in Plymouth County, Massachusetts
Protected areas established in 1976
1976 establishments in Massachusetts